El Chorro de Maíta is an early colonial archaeological site near Guardalavaca, Cuba.

The site dates from the early 16th century and consists of an excavated indigenous settlement and cemetery, including dozens of well-preserved human remains. Recent scholarship suggests that indigenous peoples were living here many decades after Christopher Columbus' arrival. Across from the site is a restaurant and a reconstructed indigenous village that features life-sized models of native dwellings.
También se puede visitar el museo Histórico de la Comandancia a sólo pocos metros del sitio arqueológico. Museo histórico de la Comandancia un lugar donde podrá aprender un poco más sobre las luchas de nuestros guerrilleros del movimiento 26 de julio, encontrarás explicaciones y objetos pertenecientes a los guerrilleros. Posibilidad de conocer los campesinos de la región y disfrutar de hermosos paisajes del campo

References

Archaeological sites in Cuba
Tourist attractions in Holguín Province

External links 

 Chorro de Maíta on ecured